"If I Never Stop Loving You" is a song written by Skip Ewing and Donny Kees, and recorded by American country music artist David Kersh.  It was released in December 1997 as the lead-off single and title track from the album If I Never Stop Loving You.  The song reached number 3 on the Billboard Hot Country Singles & Tracks chart and number 10 on the Canadian RPM Country Tracks chart, his most successful single on that chart.  It was Kersh's last top ten hit.

Music video
The music video was directed by David Abbott and premiered in November 1997.

Chart performance
"If I Never Stop Loving You" debuted at number 72 on the U.S. Billboard Hot Country Singles & Tracks for the week of December 6, 1997.

Year-end charts

References

1997 singles
Songs written by Skip Ewing
1997 songs
David Kersh songs
Curb Records singles
Songs written by Donny Kees